Torrence is an originally Scottish surname. Notable people with the name include:

A. Andrew Torrence (1902–1940), American politician
Andrew P. Torrence (c. 1921–1980), African-American university administrator
David Torrence (1864–1951), Scottish-born actor
Dean Torrence (born 1940), American singer, the Dean of 1960s singing group Jan and Dean
Ernest Torrence (1878–1933), Scottish actor
Eve Torrence (born 1963), American mathematician
Gwen Torrence (born 1965), American Olympic sprinter
Leigh Torrence (born 1982), American professional football player
Maria Torrence Wishart (1893 – 1982), Canadian medical illustrator and the founder of the University of Toronto's Art as Applied to Medicine program
Michael Torrence (1961–1996), American serial killer
Nate Torrence (born 1977), American comedic actor
O'Cyrus Torrence (born 2000), American football player
Ridgely Torrence (1874–1950), poet and editor
Walt Torrence (1936/1937–1969), American basketball player

See also
2614 Torrence, minor planet
Torrance (disambiguation), includes list of people with name Torrance
Torrent (disambiguation), includes a list of people with name Torrent